Larry Sanitoa (born ?) is an American Samoan politician and a member of the American Samoa House of Representatives, representing District #15 of Tualauta, as of 2012. Sanitoa is the son of the late Senator Seui Laau.

Sanitoa was an unsuccessful candidate for Lieutenant Governor of American Samoa in the 2016 election.

References

American Samoan politicians
Members of the American Samoa House of Representatives
Living people
Year of birth missing (living people)